is a women's association football club which plays in Japan's Nadeshiko League.

Players

Current squad

Season by season record

See also
Japan Football Association (JFA)

References

External links

Viamaterras Miyazaki on Soccerway

Women's football clubs in Japan